Terence Smith (b. New York City, 1938) is an American journalist who worked as a special correspondent at The NewsHour with Jim Lehrer, worked for The New York Times, and CBS News. Smith has been a guest host for The Diane Rehm Show, and contributes to The Huffington Post. At CBS, Smith won two Emmy Awards, in 1990 for his coverage of Hurricane Hugo, and in 1989 for his coverage of people who live near nuclear power plants. He retired from PBS NewsHour in 2006. He has strong environmental interests and served on the advisory board of the Smithsonian Environmental Research Center and chaired the Board of Trustees of the Chesapeake Bay Trust of the State of Maryland from 2015 to 2017.

Smith was born to sportswriter Red Smith, and later earned a Bachelor of Arts degree from the University of Notre Dame in 1960.

Smith is married and has two grown children and three grandchildren. He lives in the Eastport neighborhood in Annapolis, Maryland, on the shore of the Chesapeake Bay.

Works

References

Sources

External links 
 
 

Living people
University of Notre Dame alumni
American reporters and correspondents
The New York Times writers
Emmy Award winners
Place of birth missing (living people)
Environmental research institutes
Smithsonian Institution people
1938 births